The George M. Holmes Convocation Center (usually referred to as the Holmes Center) is an 8,325-seat multipurpose arena in Boone, North Carolina, United States, on the campus of Appalachian State University. The convocation center is named for George M. Holmes, a 1954 graduate and member of the North Carolina General Assembly. The arena itself is named for Seby Jones. It was built in 2000 and is home to four athletic teams: Appalachian State Mountaineers men's basketball, Appalachian State Mountaineers women's basketball, volleyball, and indoor track and field. The inaugural event was a men's basketball game held on November 17, 2000 between the Mountaineers and the Tar Heels of North Carolina. The facility replaced Varsity Gymnasium. The George M. Holmes Convocation Center’s Mission is to provide facilities for the Department of Health, Leisure and Exercise Science and to support the academic processes of Appalachian State University. Serving as a multipurpose for the northwestern region of North Carolina, the center supports university sponsored events, such as commencement and college fair. Cultural events, concerts, trade shows, athletic events and other public assembly activities are also a part of the center’s programming. 

In 2017 and 2018, it was home to the High Country Grizzlies, a professional indoor football team.

Features
Standing at the end of Rivers Street, the  structure houses the Department of Health, Leisure and Exercise Science, and includes a multipurpose arena for community and cultural events, graduation and convocation ceremonies, trade shows, concerts, and athletic events.

The 8,325-seat arena has HLES offices, classrooms, laboratories, team areas and retractable seating.

A 300-meter directional Mondo track circles the upper concourse and is used by the indoor track and field teams for both practice and competition.

Student seating is located at midcourt for both volleyball, and behind the end line for basketball.

Notable events
 The facility was opened with a celebration followed by a men’s basketball contest between Appalachian and North Carolina.
 Rap trio Migos performed on April 5, 2018. After the concert, members of the tour were arrested after the Boone Police Department found 420 grams of marijuana, 26 ounces of codeine, and Xanax. None of the three rappers were in the vehicle or charged.

See also
 List of NCAA Division I basketball arenas

References

External links
 Official site of the Holmes Center
 Holmes Center at GoASU

Appalachian State Mountaineers basketball venues
Basketball venues in North Carolina
College basketball venues in the United States
College indoor track and field venues in the United States
Sports venues in Watauga County, North Carolina
Sports venues completed in 2000
2000 establishments in North Carolina
Indoor track and field venues in the United States
Indoor arenas in North Carolina
Athletics (track and field) venues in North Carolina